Abraeus is a genus of hister beetles.

Species
 Abraeus areolatus (Reitter, 1884)
 Abraeus bolteri LeConte, 1880
 Abraeus brevissimus Roubal, 1930
 Abraeus globosus (Hoffmann, 1803)
 Abraeus granulum Erichson, 1839
 Abraeus loebli Gomy and M.Ohara, 2001
 Abraeus parvulus Aubé, 1842
 Abraeus perpusillus (Marsham, 1802)
 Abraeus roubali Olexa, 1958

External links
 Taxon: Genus Abraeus, Taxonomicon.
 Genus Abraeus, taxon profile.
 Genus Abraeus Leach, 1817, The Hokkaido University Museum.

Histeridae
Staphyliniformia genera